Trevor Matthews (born  July 24, 1982) is a Canadian film producer and actor. He is the youngest son of telecommunications billionaire Sir Terry Matthews.

Early life
Matthews was born in Ottawa and grew up in Kanata, Ontario. He attended W. Erskine Johnston, Ashbury College, Earl of March Secondary School, Carleton University, and the New York Film Academy from which he graduated in filmmaking in 2002.

Career
Matthews is the CEO and founder of Los Angeles-based Brookstreet Pictures. As an actor he has performed in Jack Brooks: Monster Slayer, The Shrine, Girl House, and several short films.

Personal life
Matthews lives in Los Angeles, California.

Filmography

See also
 List of Canadian producers
 List of Canadian actors
 List of people from Ottawa

References

External links 
 
 Brookstreet Pictures Website

1982 births
Living people
Male actors from Ottawa
Film producers from Ontario
Canadian male film actors
Canadian film production company founders
Businesspeople from Ottawa
21st-century Canadian businesspeople
Canadian people of Welsh descent
Carleton University alumni
New York Film Academy alumni
Canadian chief executives
American company founders
Wesley Clover